David Pasquesi (born December 22, 1960) is an American actor and comedian. His screen credits include Groundhog Day, Strangers with Candy, Curb Your Enthusiasm, Return to Me, The Ice Harvest, Veep, At Home with Amy Sedaris, Lodge 49, and The Book of Boba Fett.

Early life
Pasquesi was born in Chicago and raised in Lake Bluff, Illinois. He graduated from Lake Forest High School.

Career 
Pasquesi starred in the short film Regrets that premiered An Event Apart, and co-starred in I Want Someone to Eat Cheese With. He wrote for Exit 57 and Strangers with Candy, co-wrote and appeared in the Spike TV series Factory, and co-wrote and co-starred in Cop Show. In 2009, he was in the cast of Angels & Demons, where he played the character Claudio Vincenzi. He co-created and co-wrote the new show Merkin Penal. Similarly to his role of "Meat Man Stew" in Strangers With Candy, Pasquesi plays "Knife Man" in At Home with Amy Sedaris.

Pasquesi has performed at The Second City, iO Theater, Improv Institute, and Annoyance Theatre, and  studied under Del Close in the early 80s and became part of the first iO Harold team "Baron's Barracudas". He appeared in four mainstage revues at Second City as well as in plays at the Steppenwolf Theatre and the Goodman Theatre.

In 2009, he played a supporting role in the Harold Ramis film Year One as the Prime Minister of Sodom. Pasquesi was a cast member in the Chicago premiere of Yasmina Reza's God of Carnage at the Goodman Theatre.

TJ and Dave 
Since 2002, he has been performing with T. J. Jagodowski in the all improvised show "TJ and Dave". In 2006 they began an Off Broadway run, performing monthly at The Barrow Street Theatre in New York City. The Chicago Reader has described the show as "an hour of subtle character development, verbal facility, and pantomimic agility that anticipates and plays off the audience's reactions." Guests of the show include August: Osage County's Tracy Letts, Academy Award Nominee Michael Shannon, SNL's Mike O'Brien, and Absinthe's Jet Eveleth. The 2009 South by Southwest Film festival included the documentary Trust Us, This is All Made Up directed by Alex Karpovsky, which chronicles a "T.J. and Dave" performance.

Filmography

Film

Television

References

External links

Dave Pasquesi's Official Site
NY Times Theater Review of TJ and Dave
TJ and Dave Website

Living people
American male comedians
American male film actors
American male television actors
American television writers
American writers of Italian descent
American male television writers
20th-century American male actors
21st-century American male actors
1960 births
Male actors from Chicago
Screenwriters from Illinois
Comedians from Illinois
20th-century American comedians
21st-century American comedians